Kim Seon-young (born 23 February 1979) is a South Korean former judoka who competed in the 2000 Summer Olympics.

References

External links
 
 
 

1979 births
Living people
Olympic judoka of South Korea
Judoka at the 2000 Summer Olympics
Olympic bronze medalists for South Korea
Olympic medalists in judo
South Korean female judoka
Medalists at the 2000 Summer Olympics
21st-century South Korean women